The LeapTV is an educational video game console developed by LeapFrog and released on October 20, 2014. The console consists of the main unit, a motion sensing camera, and a modifiable controller for different play styles. The console was available at Walmart, Target, Amazon, and Toys "R" Us.

Games 

 Kart Racing Supercharged!
 Disney Sofia the First
 Ultimate Spider-Man
 LeapFrog Letter Factory Adventures
 Blaze and the Monster Machines
 PAW Patrol: Storm Rescuers
 Pixar Pals Plus
 Nickelodeon Dora and Friends
 Dance and Learn
 DoodleCraft
 Sports!
 Disney Frozen
 Bubble Guppies
 Jake and the Never Land Pirates
 Disney Princess

References 

2010s toys
Educational toys
Children's educational video games
2014 in video gaming
Products introduced in 2014
Home video game consoles
ARM-based video game consoles